Queensbridge School is a mixed, 11-16 comprehensive school in Moseley, West Midlands, England. It is judged an Outstanding School by Ofsted. Results in 2017 place it in top 10% schools nationally for P8 for low and high prior attainers. The school has been awarded specialist Arts College status. It shares a building with Fox Hollies School. The Headteacher is Harpinder Singh.

Notable former pupils
Shozair Ali, cricketer
Anna Brewster, actress and singer
Sonia Lannaman, athlete
Aaron Moses-Garvey, footballer for Birmingham City

References
OFSTED Report

External links
Queensbridge School Website

Secondary schools in Birmingham, West Midlands
Foundation schools in Birmingham, West Midlands